"Devil's Alphabet" is the second segment of the twenty-second episode from the first season (1985–86) of the television series The Twilight Zone. It is based on the short story "The Everlasting Club" by Arthur Gray, under the pseudonym Ingulphus. The story was first published in The Cambridge Review (October 27, 1910). The television adaptation did not modernize the story, effectively making it a period piece. Taking place over the course of 22 years, it follows a poetry society whose members are pledged to meet once a year, whether they be dead or alive.

Plot
Seven Cambridge students (Andrew, Brian, Cornelius, Deaver, Eli, Frederick, and Grant) comprise a hedonistic poetry group called The Devil's Alphabet Society. Upon their 1876 graduation, Grant proposes an oath to meet on All Souls' Day every year without excuse, not even death. The others agree to the oath, though with the amendment that a meeting may be cancelled by a simple majority vote. When Deaver commits suicide twenty years later, the surviving members discover that they are indeed bound by their oath, as evidenced by the deceased signing his name to the register and consuming a drink.

The following year, prior to the meeting Andrew is found hanging from the ceiling with no perch from which he could have committed suicide. With this macabre death souring the mood, the surviving members vote to cancel the year's meeting. Moments after, Grant is also hung from a ceiling. Brian and Eli board a carriage whose driver takes off at a dangerous speed. The carriage is engulfed by flames, consuming them.

The surviving members, Frederick and Cornelius, reunite the next year, reasoning that the previous year's events seem to indicate that they are doomed to meet an unholy death whether they meet or not, and the Devil's Alphabet no longer has enough living members to legitimately cancel a meeting. However, Cornelius finds he lacks the courage to face the ghosts of his brother members and commits suicide. Frederick attends the meeting with six ghosts. He proposes that the Devil's Alphabet Society be dissolved. The seven members reach the required unanimous vote to dissolve the society and release them from their oath. Though relieved to be freed from this burden, Frederick concludes that in all likelihood the seven of them face eternal damnation.

External links
 
 Postcards from the Zone episode 1.54 Devil's Alphabet

1986 American television episodes
The Twilight Zone (1985 TV series season 1) episodes
Fiction set in 1876
Fiction set in 1896
Fiction set in 1897
Television shows based on short fiction

fr:L'Alphabet du Diable